I Love the New Millennium is a mini-series and the tenth installment of the I Love the... series focusing on the 2000s and premiered on VH1 Monday, June 23, 2008. Each night, from Monday to Thursday, two of the eight episodes premiered, corresponding to the years from 2000 to 2007. As the series aired in 2008, it did not include episodes for the years 2008 or 2009. A second series about 2000s nostalgia called I Love the 2000s was made in 2014, including episodes for the years 2008 and 2009.

Commentators

Ant
Carlos Alazraqui
Bronson Arroyo
Natasha Bedingfield
Ty Bentli
Greg Behrendt
Michael Ian Black
Chris Booker
The Bravery (Sam Endicott and Anthony Burulcich)
Angelica Bridges
Steve Bridges
Regan Burns
Vanessa Carlton
Tommy Chong
Michelle Collins
Colton and Aboud
Molly Culver
Kat Von D
Taylor Dayne
The Donnas (Allison & Brett and Maya & Tory)
Simon Doonan
Dropkick Murphys (James Lynch and Al Barr)
Bil Dwyer
Rich Eisen
Michael Emerson
Jonny Fairplay
Dave Fickas and Ric Barbera
Greg Fitzsimmons
Jake Fogelnest
Jared Fogle
Gina Gershon
Godfrey
Gilbert Gottfried
George Gray
Luis Guzmán
Chris Hardwick
Perez Hilton
Scott Ian
Ron Jeremy
Chris Jericho
Jo Koy
The Last Goodnight (Leif Christensen, Kurtis John Henneberry, Ely Rise and Anton Yurack)
Amy Lee
Ben Lee
Lifehouse (Bryce Soderberg, Rick Woolstenhulme Jr. and Jason Wade)
Beth Littleford
Freddy Lockhart
Kurt Long
Loni Love
Luenell
Kathleen Madigan
Joe Manganiello
Constantine Maroulis
Debbie Matenopoulos
Danica McKellar
Pete Mitchell
Shanna Moakler
Moby
Mya
OK Go (Damian Kulash, Tim Nordwind, Dan Konopka and Andy Ross)
Gary Owen
Jenna Von Oy
Tom Papa
Plain White T's (Tom Higgenson, Tim Lopez, Mike Retondo, De'Mar Hamilton and Dave Tirio)
Keith Powell
Rachel Quaintance
Efren Ramirez
Donnell Rawlings
Rooney (Robert Schwartzman, Taylor Locke, Matthew Winter, Ned Brower and Louie Stephens)
Lonny Ross
Emmy Rossum
Khalid Salaam
Stuart Scott
Shaggy
Brad Sherwood
Michael Shulman
Marianne Sierk
Sisqó
Dee Snider
Hal Sparks
French Stewart
Angie Stone
Judy Tenuta
Misti Traya
Andrew W.K.
Lauren Weedman
Kevin Weisman
Wil Wheaton
Lang Whitaker

Recurring segments
 Bushism: Steve Bridges delivers a memorable Bushism from the given year.
 Time Capsule: Andrew W.K. digs up three items from a time capsule that correspond to the episode's year.
 Sisqo's Hotties I Wanted To See in a Thong: Sisqo shows three women from each year that he would like to see wear a thong.
 How Gay Was It?: For each year, gay Internet blogger Perez Hilton chooses a person or event and then rates it on his gaydar from 1 to 10.
 Video Blog: Each commentator gives an opinion on an additional topic in the form of a video blog entry.
 Then and Now: Taylor Dayne shows certain celebrities from the 2000s that also had contributions during the 1980s.
 Playlist: Moby names three hit songs from each year.
 Liar: Known for using his dead grandma strategy to win the loved ones challenge in Survivor: Pearl Islands, two-time Survivor contestant Jonny Fairplay reveals the biggest liar(s) of a particular year.
 During the credits of every episode, a clip from a popular music video was played without any type of commentary. These were usually replaced with a show promo by Vh1.

Topics covered by year

2000
 Budweiser's Whassup? ad campaign
 Dude, Where's My Car?
 Jackass
 2000 Florida presidential election
 Dennis Miller on Monday Night Football
 Razor Scooter
 Survivor
 "Who Let the Dogs Out?" by Baha Men
 Gladiator
 TiVo
 Big Mouth Billy Bass (originally introduced in 1998)
 CSI: Crime Scene Investigation
 Erin Brockovich
 Napster
 David Crosby fathers Melissa Etheridge and Julie Cypher's kids
 MTV Cribs
 Cast Away

Bushism of 2000: January 27, 2000 (Greater Nashua, New Hampshire) – "I know how hard it is for you to put food on your family."

Time Capsule of 2000: Tiger Woods' golfballs, Jared Fogle's fat pants, Brad Pitt and Jennifer Aniston's wedding photo

Sisqo's Hotties I Wanted To See in a Thong 2000: Jennifer Lopez, Jessica Alba and Kate Hudson

How Gay Was It 2000: Sinead O'Connor declares herself a lesbian and then claims to be 3/4 heterosexual and 1/4 gay. (Gaydar – 4)

Michael Ian Black's Video Blog on "Thong Song" by Sisqó

Then and Now 2000: Rob Lowe (Now: 2000 – The West Wing / Then: 1980s – Class) and U2 (Now: 2000 – U2 Brings Political Awareness to Rock and Roll / Then: 1980s – U2 Helps Bring the Mullet to America)

Playlist of 2000: "Oops!... I Did It Again" by Britney Spears, "Country Grammar" by Nelly and "All the Small Things" by Blink 182

Liar of 2000: Gordon Zwicky

2001
 Zoolander
 Live with Regis and Kelly
 "Hero" by Enrique Iglesias
 Low-rise jeans
 Fear Factor
 Komodo dragon bites Phil Bronstein 
 Pearl Harbor
 iPod
 The Weakest Link
 Moulin Rouge!
 "Lady Marmalade" by Christina Aguilera, Mýa, Lil' Kim and Pink
 Winona Ryder shoplifts
 "It Wasn't Me" by Shaggy and Rikrok (originally released in 2000)
 Segway
 Memento
 XFL
 The aftermath of 9/11

Bushism of 2001: July 22, 2001 (Rome, Italy) – "I know what I believe. I will continue to articulate what I believe and what I believe I believe what I believe is right."

Time Capsule of 2001: The Strokes' Chuck Taylor All-Stars and skinny hipster jeans, Usher's abs and Whitney Houston's crack pipe

Sisqo's Hotties I Wanted To See in a Thong 2001: Shakira, Mariah Carey and Jennifer Garner

How Gay Was It 2001: Elton John and Eminem perform together at the 2001 Grammy Awards. (Gaydar – 8)

Jo Koy's Video Blog on Iron Chef

Then and Now 2001: Ray Ban sunglasses (Now: 2001 – Hipsters / Then: 1980s – Tom Cruise) and Demi Moore (Now: 2001 – The wife of Ashton Kutcher / Then: 1980s – The wife of Bruce Willis)

Playlist of 2001: "Drive" by Incubus, "Fallin'" by Alicia Keys and "South Side" by Moby ft. Gwen Stefani

Liar of 2001: Jeffrey Skilling and Kenneth Lay

2002
 Spider-Man
 Color Alert System
 Yao Ming
 Robert Blake is accused of murder
 The Ring
 Liza Minnelli marries David Gest
 "Party Hard" by Andrew W.K.  (originally released in 2001)
 My Big Fat Greek Wedding
 Botox Parties
 Ted Williams being cryogenically frozen
 Signs
 Avril Lavigne
 Mojito, Cosmo and Martini
 Unfaithful
 David Blaine
 American Idol

Bushism of 2002: September 17, 2002 (Nashville, Tennessee) – "There's an old saying in Tennessee. I know it's probably Texas, probably Tennessee, that says 'fool me once, shame on, shame on you, fool me, um, you can't get fooled again.'"

Time Capsule of 2002: The rose from The Bachelor, Nelly's used band-aid and Michael Jackson's baby

Sisqo's Hotties I Wanted To See in a Thong 2002: Anna Kournikova, Christina Aguilera and Salma Hayek

How Gay Was It 2002: Rosie O'Donnell admits she is a lesbian and gets a haircut. (Gaydar – 6)

Lauren Weedman's Video Blog on Dr. Phil

Then and Now 2002: Charlie Sheen (Now: 2002 – Two and a Half Men / Then: 1980s – Ferris Bueller's Day Off) and Ozzy Osbourne (Now: 2002 – The Osbournes / Then: 1980s – Satan)

Playlist of 2002: "How You Remind Me" by Nickelback, "U Don't Have to Call" by Usher and "All You Wanted" by Michelle Branch

Liar of 2002: Miss Cleo

2003
 The O.C.
 Pirates of the Caribbean: The Curse of the Black Pearl
 Trucker hats
 Arnold Schwarzenegger becomes the governor of California
 Chappelle's Show
 "In da Club" by 50 Cent
 Michael Jackson facing child molestation allegations again
 Joe Millionaire
 Metrosexuals
 Clay Aiken
 Finding Nemo
 Paris Hilton sex tape
 The Siegfried & Roy tiger incident
 McGriddles
 Capture of Saddam Hussein
 The Lord of the Rings: The Return of the King

Bushism of 2003: January 29, 2003 (Grand Rapids, Michigan) – "The war on terror involves Saddam Hussein because the nature of Saddam Hussein, the history of Saddam Hussein and his willingness to terrorize himself."

Time Capsule of 2003: Ticket for Gigli, Jessica Simpson's can of Chicken of the Sea and Freedom Fries

Sisqo's Hotties I Wanted To See in a Thong 2003: Vanessa Minnillo, Scarlett Johansson and Jessica Simpson

How Gay Was It 2003: San Francisco issues marriage licenses to same-sex couples as an act of civil disobedience. (Gaydar – 6.5)

Rich Eisen's Video Blog on the VMA Kiss

Then and Now 2003: Johnny Depp (Now: 2003 – Pirates of the Caribbean: The Curse of the Black Pearl / Then: 1980s – 21 Jump Street) and Jon Cryer (Now: 2003 – Two and a Half Men / Then: 1980s – Pretty in Pink)

Playlist of 2003: "Milkshake" by Kelis, "Stand Up" by Ludacris and "Clocks" by Coldplay

Liar of 2003: Jayson Blair

2004
 Punk'd (originally premiered in 2003)
 Ken Jennings dominates Jeopardy!
 Kabbalah
 William Hung
 Jim McGreevey resigns from office
 The Da Vinci Code by Dan Brown
 Super Size Me
 Laguna Beach: The Real Orange County
 Janet Jackson's "wardrobe malfunction"
 UGG boots
 He's Just Not That into You by Greg Behrendt and Liz Tuccillo
 "I Believe in a Thing Called Love" by The Darkness (originally released in 2003)
 The Burger King
 Dance Dance Revolution
 Boston Red Sox finally destroy the Bambino curse to win the 2004 World Series

Bushism of 2004: September 6, 2004 (Grand Rapids, Michigan) – "Too many good docs are getting out of the business. Too many OBGYNs aren't able to practice their love with women all across the country."

Time Capsule of 2004: A box of DHARMA Initiative Corn Flakes, beer cup from the Pacers–Pistons brawl and Aramaic Hebrew Dictionary

Sisqo's Hotties I Wanted To See in a Thong 2004: Gwen Stefani, Lindsay Lohan and Halle Berry

How Gay Was It 2004: Cynthia Nixon announces she is gay and surprises nobody. (Gaydar – 7)

Hal Sparks' Video Blog on Catwoman

Then and Now 2004: Tony Danza (Now: 2004 – The Tony Danza Show / Then: 1980s – Who's the Boss?) and Nicollette Sheridan (Now: 2004 – Desperate Housewives / Then: 1980s – Knots Landing)

Playlist of 2004: "Mr. Brightside" by The Killers, "My Boo" by Usher ft. Alicia Keys and "American Idiot" by Green Day

Liar of 2004: Pete Rose

2005
 Pope John Paul II death and the succession of Benedict XVI
 To Catch a Predator (originally premiered in 2004)
 Grizzly Man
 The Runaway Bride
 Juiced: Wild Times, Rampant 'Roids, Smash Hits & How Baseball Got Big by José Canseco
 Sudoku
 Pat O'Brien's voicemail scandal
 Martha Stewart is released from prison
 Fauxhawks
 Hurricane Katrina/Michael D. Brown scandal
 YouTube
 "Here It Goes Again" by OK Go (wasn't released until 2006 a year after the song's recording)
 Fat Actress
 Bill O'Reilly's sexual harassment lawsuit
 March of the Penguins

Bushism of 2005: April 14, 2005 (Washington, D.C.) – "I'm gonna spend a lot of time on Social Security. I enjoy it. I enjoy taking on the issues. It's the mother in me."

Time Capsule of 2005: A dead bird from the H5N1 outbreak, bicycle seat from Lance Armstrong's final Tour De France race and Dwight Schrute's bobblehead

Sisqo's Hotties I Wanted To See in a Thong 2005: Eva Mendes, Eva Longoria and Heidi Klum

How Gay Was It 2005: MTV Networks launches Logo, the first cable channel for gay, lesbian, bisexual and transgender people. (Gaydar – 5)

Simon Doonan's Video Blog on Brokeback Mountain

Then and Now 2005: Patrick Dempsey (Now: 2005 – Grey's Anatomy / Then: 1980s – Can't Buy Me Love) and Kirstie Alley (Now: 2005 – Fat Actress / Then: 1980s – Cheers)

Playlist of 2005: "Gold Digger" by Kanye West ft. Jamie Foxx, "Beverly Hills" by Weezer and "Since U Been Gone" by Kelly Clarkson

Liar of 2005: Rafael Palmeiro

The episode concluded with Colton & Aboud recapping the major Britney Spears moments from the first five years.

2006
 Borat: Cultural Learnings of America for Make Benefit Glorious Nation of Kazakhstan
 Mel Gibson's DUI incident
 MySpace (originally introduced in 2003)
 Crocs
 Dreamgirls
 "London Bridge" by Fergie
 Neil Patrick Harris and Lance Bass coming out of the closet
 Casino Royale
 Dick Cheney hunting incident
 "You're Beautiful" by James Blunt (originally released in 2005)
 Little Miss Sunshine
 "Stupid Girls" by Pink
 Kim Jong-il tests missiles
 Rachael Ray
 "Bad Day" by Daniel Powter
 24 (originally premiered in 2001)

Bushism of 2006: May 7, 2006 (Germany) – "I would say my best moment of all in office is when I caught a 7.5-pound largemouth bass in my lake. Hey, this is serious right here. Fish are cleverer than you think."

Time Capsule of 2006: Naomi Campbell's jeweled cell-phone, DNA sample from Suri Cruise and Pamela Anderson's three wedding bikinis

Sisqo's Hotties I Wanted To See in a Thong 2006: Hayden Panettiere, Nelly Furtado and Jenna Fischer

How Gay Was It 2006: Will & Grace airs its final episode after eight seasons on NBC. (Gaydar – 8.5)

Jenna Von Oy's Video Blog on Grey's Anatomy

Then and Now 2006: Sylvester Stallone (Now: 2006 – Rocky Balboa / Then: 1980s – Rocky III and Rocky IV) and William Shatner (Now: 2006 – Priceline.com / Then: 1980s – T.J. Hooker)

Playlist of 2006: "It Ends Tonight" by The All-American Rejects", "Wait a Minute" by The Pussycat Dolls and "I Write Sins Not Tragedies" by Panic! at the Disco

Liar of 2006: James Frey

2007
 300
 GEICO Cavemen commercials
 iPhone
 Bob Barker retires from The Price Is Right and Drew Carey takes his place
 Transformers
 "Rehab" by Amy Winehouse
 Don Imus controversy
 Astronaut Lisa Nowak's attempted kidnapping
 "Umbrella" by Rihanna and Jay-Z
 Are You Smarter Than a 5th Grader?
 David Beckham joins the L.A. Galaxy
 Chris Daughtry
 Guyliner
 Michael Vick arrested for dog fighting
 "Hey There Delilah" by Plain White T's (originally released in 2006)
 The Bourne Ultimatum

Bushism of 2007: May 2, 2007 (Washington, D.C.) – "Information is moving. You know, nightly news is one way, of course, but it's also moving through the blog-o-sphere, and through the inter-nets."

Time Capsule of 2007: Britney Spears' leftover hair, Barry Bonds' steroid needle and VHS copy of a drunken David Hasselhoff

Sisqo's Hotties I Wanted To See in a Thong 2007: Jessica Biel, Kim Kardashian and Victoria's Secret's Gisele Bundchen & Adriana Lima

How Gay Was It 2007: Dear Abby says, "It's OK to be gay." (Gaydar – 5)

Colton & Aboud's Video Blog on Knocked Up

Then and Now 2007: Bruce Willis (Now: 2007 – Live Free or Die Hard / Then: 1980s – Die Hard) and Taylor Dayne (Now: 2007 – Pop Sensation / Then: 1980s – Pop Sensation)

Playlist of 2007: "Shut Up and Drive" by Rihanna, "All Good Things (Come to an End)" by Nelly Furtado and "Thnks fr th Mmrs" by Fall Out Boy

Liar of 2007: Scooter Libby

Teaser trailer for fake future I Love the New Millennium topics is shown at the end of the episode.

References

External links
 

Nostalgia television shows
Nostalgia television in the United States
VH1 original programming
2000s American television miniseries
2008 American television series debuts
2008 American television series endings